The book of Obadiah is a book of the Bible whose authorship is attributed to Obadiah, a prophet who lived in the Assyrian Period. Obadiah is one of the Twelve Minor Prophets in the final section of Nevi'im, the second main division of the Hebrew Bible. The text consists of a single chapter, divided into 21 verses, making it the shortest book in the Hebrew Bible. The book concerns the divine judgment of Edom and the restoration of Israel.

Content 

The Book of Obadiah is based on a prophetic vision concerning the fall of Edom, a mountain-dwelling nation whose founding father was Esau. Obadiah describes an encounter with Yahweh, who addresses Edom's arrogance and charges them for their "violence against your brother Jacob".

Throughout most of the history of Judah, Edom was controlled absolutely from Jerusalem as a vassal state. Obadiah said that the high elevation of their dwelling place in the mountains of Seir had gone to their head, and they had puffed themselves up in pride. "'Though you soar like the eagle and make your nest among the stars, from there I will bring you down,' declares the Lord".

In the Siege of Jerusalem (597 BC), Nebuchadnezzar II sacked Jerusalem, carted away the King of Judah, and installed a puppet ruler. The Edomites helped the Babylonians loot the city. Obadiah, writing this prophecy around 590 BCE, suggests the Edomites should have remembered that blood was thicker than water. "On the day you stood aloof while strangers carried off his wealth and foreigners entered his gates and cast lots for Jerusalem, you were like one of them... You should not march through the gates of my people in the day of their disaster, nor gloat over them in their calamity in the day of their disaster, nor seize their wealth in the day of their disaster."

Obadiah said in judgment Yahweh would wipe out the house of Esau forever, and not even a remnant would remain. The Edomites' land would be possessed by Egypt and they would cease to exist as a people. The Day of the Lord was at hand for all nations, and someday the children of Israel would return from their exile and possess the land of Edom.

Scholarly issues

Dating Obadiah
The date of composition is disputed and is difficult to determine due to the lack of personal information about Obadiah, his family, and his historical milieu. The date of composition must therefore be determined based on the prophecy itself. Edom is to be destroyed due to its lack of defense for its brother nation, Israel, when it was under attack. There are two major historical contexts within which the Edomites could have committed such an act. These are during 853 – 841 BCE when Jerusalem was invaded by Philistines and Arabs during the reign of Jehoram of Judah (recorded in 2 Kings  and 2 Chronicles  in the Christian Old Testament) and 607 – 586 BCE when Jerusalem was attacked by Nebuchadnezzar II of Babylon, which led to the Babylonian exile of Israel (recorded in Psalm 137). The earlier period would place Obadiah as a contemporary of the prophet Elijah.

The later date would place Obadiah as a contemporary of the prophet Jeremiah. A sixth-century date for Obadiah is a "near consensus" position among scholars.  contains parallels to the Book of Jeremiah . The passage in the Book of Jeremiah dates from the fourth year of the reign of Jehoiakim (604 BCE), and therefore  seems to refer to the destruction of Jerusalem by Nebuchadnezzar II (586 BCE). It is more likely that Obadiah and the Book of Jeremiah together were drawing on a common source presently unknown to us rather than Jeremiah drawing on previous writings of Obadiah as his source.

Sepharad

The term "Sepharad" mentioned in the 20th verse of Obadiah comes from the Hebrew word for Spain.

Scriptural parallels 

Old Testament

New Testament
 1 Thessalonians 5:2, Acts 2:20, 

See also 
 The fields of Ephraim
 The land of Gilead
 The lowland of Philistia
 The fields of Samaria
 Teman

References

External links 

 Masoretic text from Mechon Mamre
 Translations:
 Jewish translations:
 Ovadiah (Judaica Press) translation [with Rashi's commentary] from Chabad.org
 Christian translations:
 Online Bible at GospelHall.org (KJV ESV Darby BBE)
 Obadiah at The Great Books (New Revised Standard Version)
 
 Commentary:
 Ovadiah (Judaica Press) translation [with Rashi's commentary] from Chabad.org
 Obadiah, from John Gill's Exposition of the Entire Bible.
 Obadiah, from the United Church of God, an International Association Bible Reading Program – This Hebrew scholar provides extensive background information as well as verse-by-verse exposition]
 Kretzmann's Popular Commentary of the Bible (navigate to Obadiah using the menu on the left)
 Obadiah: The Lord Will Have His Day by Jonathan Kuske
 Obadiah: an Introduction by Jim West

 
9th-century BC books
6th-century BC books
1st-millennium BC books
Twelve Minor Prophets